Corny Point can refer to:
 Corny Point (South Australia), a headland
 Corny Point, South Australia, a settlement east of the headland
 Corny Point Lighthouse, a lighthouse in South Australia